Betaine reductase is an enzyme that catalyzes the chemical reaction

acetyl phosphate + trimethylamine + thioredoxin disulfide  N,N,N-trimethylglycine + phosphate + thioredoxin

The 3 substrates of this enzyme are acetyl phosphate, trimethylamine, and thioredoxin disulfide, whereas its 3 products are N,N,N-trimethylglycine, phosphate, and thioredoxin.

This enzyme belongs to the family of oxidoreductases, specifically those acting on X-H and Y-H to form an X-Y bond with a disulfide as acceptor.  The systematic name of this enzyme class is acetyl-phosphate trimethylamine:thioredoxin disulfide oxidoreductase (N,N,N-trimethylglycine-forming).

References

 
 

EC 1.21.4
Enzymes of unknown structure